Stan Godrie (born 9 January 1993) is a Dutch cyclist, who currently rides for Dutch amateur team Orange Babies Cycling Team. He rode in the men's elite event at the 2016 UCI Cyclo-cross World Championships in Heusden-Zolder.

Major results

Road

2011
 1st  Road race, National Junior Road Championships
 3rd Overall GP Denmark
 9th Road race, UCI Junior Road World Championships
2012
 3rd Memorial Van Coningsloo
 4th Kernen Omloop Echt-Susteren
2014
 1st Stage 4 Kreiz Breizh Elites
2015
 1st  Road race, National Under-23 Road Championships
 2nd Antwerpse Havenpijl
 2nd Kernen Omloop Echt-Susteren
 3rd Grand Prix de la ville de Pérenchies
 9th Paris–Roubaix Espoirs
2016
 6th Ronde van Overijssel
 6th Arnhem–Veenendaal Classic
 7th Grand Prix de la ville de Pérenchies
 9th Kernen Omloop Echt-Susteren

Cyclo-cross

2010–2011
 1st Hamme-Zogge, Junior Superprestige
 2nd National Junior Championships
 10th UCI World Junior Championships
2011–2012
 1st Middelkerke, Under-23 Superprestige
 3rd  UEC European Under-23 Championships
 3rd National Under-23 Championships
2012–2013
 2nd Gran Premio Mamma E Papa Guerciotti AM
2014–2015
 1st  National Under-23 Championships
 1st Gran Premio Mamma E Papa Guerciotti AM
 3rd  UCI World Under-23 Championships
 3rd Centrumcross Surhuisterveen
2015–2016
 3rd Cyclo-cross International de Marle
 3rd Kiremko Nacht van Woerden
2016–2017
 1st Ziklokross Igorre
 2nd Asteasuko Ziklo-krosa
 2nd Kiremko Nacht van Woerden
2018–2019
 2nd Jingle Cross 1
2021–2022
 3rd Internationale GP Destil

References

External links

1993 births
Living people
Cyclo-cross cyclists
Dutch male cyclists
Sportspeople from Breda
Cyclists from North Brabant